Turtletown is an unincorporated community in Polk County, Tennessee, United States. Turtletown is in a primarily mountainous terrain, covered in forests except for areas cleared by farmers, ponds, or roads. Turtletown has a post office with ZIP code 37391. Turtletown's borders, however, in the eyes of some are disputed. According to one, parts of it are known as Dogtown, which appears on a few local maps. However, to others, it is simply all Turtletown and Dogtown does not exist. The only known map that contains this is the USGS map of the area, and a U.S. Forest Service map. There is an abandoned school, Turtletown School, across the street from the Post Office.

Population and Ethnic groups
The population, according to the United States Census Bureau, is  1,325 although the estimated population of Polk County is about 16,730 people.

Geography
Turtletown is in a primarily mountainous terrain, covered in forests except for areas cleared by farmers, ponds, or roads. It also has creeks in the area.

References

External links

 Unincorporated communities in Polk County, Tennessee
 Unincorporated communities in Tennessee